Shunri Oda from the Tokyo Institute of Technology, Tokyo, Japan was named Fellow of the Institute of Electrical and Electronics Engineers (IEEE) in 2012 for contributions to silicon quantum dot devices.

References

Fellow Members of the IEEE
Living people
Year of birth missing (living people)
Academic staff of Tokyo Institute of Technology